Crispa may refer to:
 Crispa (elm cultivar), a slow-growing tree
 Crispa, a clothing brand
 Crispa Redmanizers, a basketball team
 Crispa 400, a basketball team
 Crispa, a peppermint cultivar
 Margery Ruth Crisp, a cryptic crossword setter

See also
 CRISPR (Clustered regularly interspaced short palindromic repeats), segments of prokaryotic DNA